Victory Day is a commonly used name for public holidays in various countries, where it commemorates a nation's triumph over a hostile force in a war or the liberation of a country from hostile occupation. In many cases, multiple countries may observe the same holiday, with the most prominent united celebrations occurring in states that comprised the Allies of World War II, celebrating the defeat of Nazi Germany.

List

See also

 11 November: Remembrance Day, Veterans Day, Armistice Day
 Liberation Day: List of dates on which countries were liberated from occupiers
 National Day: A day marking the founding of a nation which can be related to a key victory

References

Victory days
Types of national holidays
Lists of observances